Compass Rose Bouquet is the second album by the American rock band, Great Lakes Myth Society. It was released on June 10, 2007.

Track listing
"Heydays"
"Summer Bonfire"
"Nightfall at Electric Park"
"Queen of the Barley Fool"
"March"
"Eastern Birds"
"Stump Speech"
"Midwest Main Street"
"Days of Apple Pie"
"Raindrops & Roses"
"Debutante"
"The Gales of 1838"

Personnel
Timothy Monger
Jamie Monger
Gregory McIntosh
Scott McClintock
Fido Kennington

References 

2007 albums
Great Lakes Myth Society albums